La lupa (also known as She-Wolf, The Vixen and The Devil Is a Woman) is a 1953 Italian drama film directed by Alberto Lattuada.

It is based on the novella with the same name by Giovanni Verga.

Synopsis 
In a remote village in southern Italy, La Lupa ("The Wolf"), a woman with a free attitude and manners, fascinates and attracts husbands and sons who can't resist her. However, she falls in love with Nanni, who grows olive trees and wants to marry her daughter, Maricchia. At her mother's urging, Maricchia marries Nanni. But "the Wolf" still lurks around the latter, to the great despair of Maricchia. Overwhelmed, Nanni then decides to kill "the Wolf" ... which will have an atrocious end.

Adaptation 
It should also be noted that Giovanni Verga later made a theatrical adaptation (1896) - one of the plays was directed by Franco Zeffirelli with Anna Magnani and Lucia Bosé in 1965 - and then a libretto. For a musical melodrama, in collaboration with De Robertis, composed by Giacomo Puccini and then G.-A. Tasca and represented in 1933.

Cast 
Kerima: The 'She-Wolf' 
Ettore Manni: Nanni Lasca
May Britt: Maria Maricchia
Ignazio Balsamo: Don Antonio Malerba
Mario Passante: Imbornone
Giovanna Ralli: Agnese
Salvo Libassi: Raffaele
Anna Arena: Giovanna Vasilio
Maurizio Arena

References

External links

1953 films
Films directed by Alberto Lattuada
1953 drama films
Italian drama films
Films based on Italian novels
Films based on works by Giovanni Verga
Films shot in Matera
Italian black-and-white films
1950s Italian films